Keasden Beck is a stream in Yorkshire (formerly the West Riding) rising near Keasden Head, joining the River Wenning south west of Clapham.

References

External links
 Catchment map

Rivers of North Yorkshire